The Wrangel class was a class of two destroyers built for the Royal Swedish Navy during World War I. The class consisted of  and .

Overview
Unlike the destroyers of the previous series, they received a forecastle which notably improved seaworthiness along with being equipped with the first steam turbines in the Swedish Navy.

It was planned to build a series of four ships, but the order for the second pair of obsolete destroyers was refused.

Ships in class

 
Destroyers of the Swedish Navy